Lienhardt is a surname. Notable people with the surname include:

Godfrey Lienhardt (1921–1993), British anthropologist
Peter Lienhardt (1928–1986), British social anthropologist

See also
Lienhard
Lienhart
Linhart
Linhardt